Togolok Moldo (real name: Байымбет Абдырахманов, Bayymbet Abdyrakhmanov; 10 June 1860 – 4 January 1942) was a Kyrgyz poet, Manaschi and folk song writer. Born in the village Kurtka in what is now the Ak-Talaa District, Naryn Region, Kyrgyzstan. Togolok Moldo by his audiences – "togolok" means round-faced, "moldo" means an educated person.
He is buried near the village of about 3,000 persons named for him in Ak-Talaa district.

A 'Semetey', totalling around 2050 lines, was collected from him by Kayum Miftakov in 1922. His later self-transcribed version of Manas was published in 2013. A manuscript of a sanjira (genealogy) was edited and published in 2009.

Bibliography
Тоголок Молдо. Избранное. (Togolok Moldo. Selected.) (1958, translated in Russian from Kyrgyz). Goslitizdat.
Дорогой песен (1958, translated in Russian from Kyrgyz). Molodaya Gvardiya.
Волк и лиса (Wolf and Fox, 1972, translated in Russian from Kyrgyz). Mektep.

References

External links 
Тоголок Молдо (Байымбет Абдырахманов). National Kyrgyz Library

Kyrgyzstani poets
 Kyrgyzstani songwriters
1860 births
1942 deaths
Manaschis
People from Naryn Region
19th-century Kyrgyzstani writers
20th-century Kyrgyzstani writers